Barabanlı is a village in Mut district of Mersin Province, Turkey. As of 2012, the population of  Barabanlı was 787. According to the page of the village school the name of the village either refers to a certain Baraban clan or Turkish adverb beraber ("together") referring to Yayla tradition of Mut residents.

References

Villages in Mut District